Joseph Nathan Ward (born January 21, 1963) is a retired American professional basketball player. He was the Phoenix Suns' second round draft pick in the 1986 NBA draft.

Early life

As an 11-year-old in the mid-1970s, Ward first played basketball games in the Griffin (Ga.) Spalding County Parks and Recreation Department’s youth program.

College basketball career
Ward first played at Clemson University as a freshman. He transferred to the University of Georgia and sat out the 1983 season. He became a starter five games into his sophomore season and made 90% of his free throws as a sophomore as well. He remained a starter for the next three years. As a senior under coach Hugh Durham in  1985–86, Ward was named to the Coaches' All-SEC first team with averages of 15.6 points and 5.3 rebounds per game.

He averaged a combined 11.2 points in his college playing career, shot 53.7% from the field, and was known to have great jumping ability. Being a favorite of Georgia Bulldog fans in the mid-1980s, Ward was honored as part of the Chick-Fil-A SEC Basketball Legends program at the 2006 SEC Tournament.

CBA career
Ward also played in the Continental Basketball Association (CBA) with the Savannah Spirits, Tulsa Fast Breakers, Rapid City Thrillers, Yakima Sun Kings and Oklahoma City Cavalry. In total, Ward played six seasons in the CBA, averaging 15.3 points and 5.5 rebounds per game for his career. He won a league championship with Tulsa in 1989 and was a second team All-CBA pick in 1991 with Rapid City.

PBA stint
Ward played in the Philippines for the Añejo Rum 65 ballclub in the Philippine Basketball Association. When he arrived in Manila, Ward was fresh from the Philadelphia 76ers camp. He displayed guts in his PBA debut on October 20, 1988, battling cramps in tossing 55 points, his highest total output in his PBA stint was 78 points on December 1, 1988.

Coaching career
After a nine year playing career in 1994, Ward arrived in the Knoxville area and started coaching with the Rule Christian Academy (RCA) recreation program. In nine years there, he won championships as he guided RCA’s 15 to 17-year-olds and would sometimes coach three different teams in a season.

In 2014, Ward was recruited to join the UP Fighting Maroons men's basketball coaching staff of Rey Madrid. He was brought in primarily to train two bigs from UP’s Team B. Due to the Madrid's departure from the team in 2015, Ward began to coach the Maroons on an interim basis. A few months later, while also being the UP-affiliated Diliman Fighting Maroons coach in the Filsports Basketball Association, he was promoted as head coach of the Maroons.

In 2019, Ward joined the Adamson Falcons men's basketball coaching staff under head coach Franz Pumaren.

In 2022, Ward became the Head Coach of (Knoxville) Central High School boys' basketball team.

References

External links
The Draft Review profile

1963 births
Living people
American expatriate basketball people in the Philippines
American men's basketball players
Barangay Ginebra San Miguel players
Basketball players from Georgia (U.S. state)
Clemson Tigers men's basketball players
Georgia Bulldogs basketball players
Oklahoma City Cavalry players
UP Fighting Maroons basketball coaches
Philippine Basketball Association imports
Phoenix Suns draft picks
Rapid City Thrillers players
Savannah Spirits players
Small forwards
Tulsa Fast Breakers players
Yakima Sun Kings players
Adamson Soaring Falcons basketball coaches